Asai Anna Arumai Thambi is a 1955 Indian Tamil-language film directed by G. R. Rao. The film stars T. R. Ramachandran, A. P. Nagarajan and Madhuri Devi .

Plot 
Sivaraman and Balaraman are brothers living together. They have no parents. Sivaraman is a graduate and looking for a job. Balaraman is not educated but a wise man. He does the household works. He respects his elder brother as a God.
Pandian lives in the same area. Pandian told his daughter Kannamma to help Balaraman in cooking. Though Sivaraman is unemployed, he marries Kannamma on the recommendation by Balaraman. Soon the couple are blessed with a child.
Sivaraman has borrowed money from a lender but not repaid it for a long time. He absconds from the lender. However, one day the lender has seen and started chasing him. Sivaraman ran away and hides in a big house.
Zamindar Anandan lives in that house with his daughter Bharathi. He came to live in the city as he was scared of a big man Sakuni in his village. Sakuni, true to his name, is a schemer. He makes his son as an advocate so that the son can marry Bharathi and take over the Zamin.
Anandan sees the well built Sivaraman and appoints his as the manager of his zamin estate. Sivaraman had to go to the village in a rush even without informing his wife and younger brother.While Sivaraman is encountered by Sakuni and undergoes many tribulations including going to jail on a charge of murder, Balaraman and Kannamma struggles due to poverty. How everything is settled forms the rest of the story.

Cast 
Adapted from the film's song book.

Male Cast
 A. P. Nagarajan as Sivaraman
 T. R. Ramachandran as Balaraman
 Sairam as Pandian
 V. M. Ezhumalai as Pandit
 Sivasuriyan as Anandam (Zamindar)
 Narayana Pillai as Sakuni
 A. Karunanidhi as Karuppu
 Raghuveer as Doctor Sukumaran
 Balaram as Folk dancer

Female Cast
 Madhuri Devi as Kannamma
 Rajasulochana as Bharathi
 Sushila as Kalyani
 Bhagyam as Segappu
 Vimala as Dhanam

Soundtrack 
Music was composed by K. V. Mahadevan and the lyrics were penned by: Thanjai N. Ramaiah Dass, A. Maruthakasi and Ka. Mu. Sheriff.

References 

1950s Tamil-language films
1955 films